I Can I BB (also known as You Can You BB from the first to the seventh season) is an online debate variety show in China. It was produced by IQIYI and MEWE. The first season was released in 2014. In total, there are seven seasons until 2021. The show host is Ma Dong. Many famous people in different fields in China were invited to the show. These guests could be an economist (e.g. Zhaofeng Xue)，a businessman (e.g. Zhengyu Luo), or a talk show performer (e.g. Dan Li and Jin Xing), etc. I Can I BB reached 780 million viewers in its fourth season.  It is one of the most popular shows in China, especially on social media such as the Chinese TikTok.

Meaning of “BB” 
“BB” is in Beijing and Northeastern dialect, originally coming with a slang “You can you up, No can no BB” (“你行你上，不行就别BB”）. This slang means that “if you are better than who you criticize, you go and do it; if not, then shut up”. “BB” means “to talk nonsense”.

Topics and contestants

Topics 
Topics and resolutions are collected from online platforms such as Weibo and in IQIYI PaoPao. The resolutions in the show are from day to day topics, including relationships, family, ideology, trends, careers, friendship, etc. Everyone can come up resolutions and hashtag a specific hashtag requested by IQIYI. Then IQIYI and MEWE sort the suggestions and open public poll to finalize the resolution list.

Contestants 
Contestants' background are diverse. Candidates are selected from the people who are fluent in Chinese all over world. Many of them are not even Chinese. Some of them are from Singapore and United States. In the early seasons, many candidates are professional debaters from top universities such as Yale University, Peking University, but most of the contestants originally major in non-debate areas. There are fashion hosts, actors, college professors, politicians, students, writers, etc.

Seasons and episodes

The first season 
In this season, Ma Dong is the program host. Kevin Tsai, Xiaosong Gao are the instructors. In each episode, one famous female is invited to the show. They joke around and decide which debater is kept and which is knocked out at the end of the episode.

Results 
 1st place: Weiwei Ma
 2nd place: Rujing Yan
 3rd place: Xiao Xiao

Episodes and resolutions 
The following table is a summary of the resolutions discussed and their corresponding show date of  Season 1.

The second season 
Instructors: Kevin Tsai and Jin Xing

Results 
 1st place: Chen Qiu
 2nd place: Xiao Xiao
 3rd place: Ming Chen and Rujing Yan

Episodes and resolutions 
The following table is a summary of the resolutions discussed and their corresponding show date of  Season 2.

The Seventh Season

In the seventh season of I Can I BB, the show heritage the rules from previous season. The hoster Dong Ma invited four famous instructors who are expert from their area: 

Kevin Tsai, a Taiwanese writer, television host. film director and screenwriter. 

Dan Li, a Chinese stand-up comedian, scriptwriter, planner, and writer. 

Zhaofeng Xue, an internet economics scholar and former co-director of Peking University's Law and Economics Research Center. 

Qing Liu, professor of East China Normal University, director of the Center for World Politics at East China Normal University.

In this season, the show's criteria for selecting debate topics are more relevant to the present, with priority given to topics that "can only be discussed in 2020".

The final BBKing（Champion）: ShouEr Fu.

What's new?

There is a new competition for the comeback spots called “That's Nonsense” in which debaters have been asked some random nonsense sentences from online. Then debater needs to react quickly and argue back.

Episodes and resolutions 
The following table is a summary of the resolutions discussed and their corresponding show date of  Season 7.

Platforms that I Can I BB is on shown
Type “奇葩说” into the search bar.

References
4. http://ent.enorth.com.cn/system/2020/12/25/050827655.shtml

5. https://www.iqiyi.com/lib/m_8494635515061314.html?platform=14
2014 Chinese television series debuts
Chinese variety television shows